Brandon—Souris is a federal electoral district in Manitoba, Canada, that has been represented in the House of Commons of Canada since 1953.

Demographics
According to the Canada 2011 Census

Ethnic groups: 83.4% White, 9.8% Aboriginal, 2.3% Latin American, 1.7% Chinese
Languages: 85.8% English, 4.3% German, 2.3% Spanish, 1.7% French, 1.4% Chinese
Religions: 67.4% Christian (23.3% United Church, 16.6% Catholic, 12.5% "Other Christian", 6.1% Anglican, 2.1% Presbyterian, 1.8% Lutheran, 1.6% Baptist), 30.5% None. 
Median income: $30,394 (2010)
Average income: $36,827 (2010)

Geography
The district is in the southwestern corner of the Province of Manitoba. It is bordered by the electoral district of Dauphin—Swan River—Neepawa to the north, the electoral district of Portage—Lisgar to the east, the Canada–United States border to the south, and the Province of Saskatchewan to the west.

It includes the communities of Brandon, Cornwallis, Virden, Killarney, Souris and North Cypress.

History
The electoral district was created in 1952 from the former districts of Brandon and Souris. It has been held by a centre-right party for all but one term of its existence. This tradition was broken in 1993 when massive vote-splitting between the Progressive Conservatives and Reform allowed the Liberals to sneak up the middle and take the riding. However, the seat reverted to form in 1997 when the PCs reclaimed it. The PCs and their successors, the modern Conservatives, have held the seat ever since. While Brandon has some Liberal and NDP support, it is not enough to overcome the conservative bent in the more rural areas of the riding.

This riding lost territory to Dauphin—Swan River—Neepawa and gained territory from Portage—Lisgar during the 2012 electoral redistribution.

Members of Parliament
This riding has elected the following Members of Parliament:

Election results

^ Conservative change is from combined Canadian Alliance and Progressive Conservative.  Percent change based on redistributed results.

See also
 List of Canadian federal electoral districts
 Past Canadian electoral districts

References

 
Brandon–Souris in Elections Canada's 308 Electoral Districts Database
Brandon–Souris in Elections Canada's 301 Electoral Districts Database
 Expenditures - 2008
Expenditures - 2004
Expenditures - 2000
Expenditures - 1997

Notes

Manitoba federal electoral districts
Politics of Brandon, Manitoba